Tom, Tommy, or Thomas Curry may refer to:

Tom Curry (footballer) (1894–1958), English footballer
Tom Curry (rugby union) (born 1998), English rugby union player
Tom Curry (writer) (1900–1976), American pulp fiction writer
Thomas J. Curry (born 1957), Comptroller of the Currency of the United States
Thomas John Curry (born 1943), bishop of the Roman Catholic Church
Tommy J. Curry, professor at the University of Edinburgh

See also
Thomas Currie (disambiguation)
Tim Curry (disambiguation)